Paolo Terracino (died 1575) was a Roman Catholic prelate who served as Bishop of Calvi Risorta (1566–1575).

Biography
On 10 June 1566, Paolo Terracino was appointed by Pope Pius V as Bishop of Calvi Risorta. 
He served as Bishop of Calvi Risorta until his death in 1575.

References

External links and additional sources
 (for Chronology of Bishops) 
 (for Chronology of Bishops) 

16th-century Italian Roman Catholic bishops
1575 deaths
Bishops appointed by Pope Pius V